Yallingup is a town in the South West region of Western Australia,  south of Perth. Yallingup is a popular tourist destination because of its beaches and limestone caves, and proximity to Leeuwin-Naturaliste National Park.

History and industry
Yallingup's name means "Place of caves" in the local Aboriginal Wardandi dialect, with "yal" meaning "large hole"; the name has been rumoured to mean "place of love" due to the popularity of weddings and honeymoons in the town. After its caves were discovered by European settlers in 1899, Yallingup became popular with tourists, and its early infrastructure was photographed by Coyarre. There was a state primary school in Yallingup from 1905 to 1963; the site now contains a Steiner school. Around 1920, the Yallingup Hall, which was previously a school building in Karridale, was moved to the townsite and reassembled. Tourism and viticulture are Yallingup's primary industries.

Geography and climate
Yallingup experiences a Mediterranean climate (Köppen climate classification Csa/Csb).

Tourist attractions

The beaches of Yallingup, such as Three Bears, Yallingup, Smiths Beach (including Supertubes), and Injidup, are well known surfing locations, and are also suitable for fishing.

The Leeuwin-Naturaliste National Park houses Canal Rocks, a coastal rock formation, and limestone caves, such as Ngilgi Cave (formerly called Yallingup Cave).

The Cape to Cape Track runs across the beach to the west of the town and Yallingup is one of the few towns located along the track.

Injidup Beach contains Injidup Natural Spa, also known as Wyadup Spa, a natural rock pool.

Smiths Beach
Smiths Beach has been the site of extended proposals for development that have eventuated in political events and various scandals over the years.

Flora and fauna

Flora 
Yallingup is home to many different types of bushland and wildlife. The surrounding area is made up of wet sclerophyllous forest. Yallingup is a biodiversity hotspot that includes the Mediterranean forests, woodlands, and scrub ecoregions of Western Australia.

Fauna 
The Yallingup region is home to a diverse range of species including the western grey kangaroo and over 70 types of birds, creating a healthy ecosystem for the many mammals, reptiles and aviaries. To maintain wildlife population the Western Australia government has placed sanctuary zones and nature reserves where minimal human life and impact can occur.

See also
 Margaret River (wine region)
 Flora of Australia

References

External links

Yallingup at MargaretRiver.com

 
Coastal towns in Western Australia
Surfing locations in South West Western Australia